, also known as , or simply , was a Japanese author and Buddhist monk. His most famous work is Tsurezuregusa (Essays in Idleness), one of the most studied works of medieval Japanese literature. Kenko wrote during the Muromachi and Kamakura periods.

Life and work
Kenkō was probably born in 1283, the son of an administration official. Forged documents by the Yoshida Shinto authorities claimed that his original name was Urabe Kaneyoshi (卜部 兼好), and that his last name was later Yoshida (吉田); all of this was recently demonstrated to be false, in new research by Ogawa Takeo. He became an officer of guards at the Imperial palace. Late in life he retired from public life and became a Buddhist monk and hermit. The reasons for this are unknown, but it has been conjectured that either his unhappy love for the daughter of the prefect of Iga Province or his mourning over the death of Emperor Go-Uda caused his transformation.

Although he also wrote poetry and entered some poetry contests at the imperial court (his participation in 1335 and 1344 is documented), Kenkō's enduring fame is based on Tsurezuregusa, his collection of 243 short essays, published posthumously. Although traditionally translated as "Essays in Idleness," a more accurate translation would be "Notes from Leisure Hours" or "Leisure Hour Notes." Themes of the essays include the beauty of nature, the transience of life, traditions, friendship, and other abstract concepts. The work was written in the  zuihitsu ("follow-the-brush") style, a type of stream-of-consciousness writing that allowed the writer's brush to skip from one topic to the next, led only by the direction of thoughts. Some are brief remarks of only a sentence or two; others recount a story over a few pages, often with discursive personal commentary added.

The Tsurezuregusa was already popular in the 15th century and was considered a classic from the 17th century onward. It is part of the modern Japanese high school curriculum, as well in some International Baccalaureate Diploma Programme schools.

See also 
Chance, Linda H. Formless in Form: Kenko, Tsurezuregusa, and the Rhetoric of Japanese Fragmentary Prose. Stanford UP, 1997.
Keene, Donald. Essays in Idleness: The Tsurezuregusa of Kenko. Columbia UP, 1967.

References

External links

 Essays by Yoshida Kenko at Quotidiana.org
 The Timeless Wisdom of Kenko

1283 births
1352 deaths
Buddhist writers
Japanese writers
Japanese essayists
Japanese hermits
Japanese Buddhist clergy
Kamakura period Buddhist clergy